The 2012–13 NCAA football bowl games were a series of college football bowl games.  They concluded the 2012 NCAA Division I FBS football season, and included 35 team-competitive games and four all-star games.  The games began on Saturday December 15, 2012 and, aside from the all-star games, concluded with the 2013 BCS National Championship Game in Miami Gardens, Florida that was played on January 7, 2013.

The total of 35 team-competitive bowls was unchanged from the previous year. While bowl games had been the purview of only the very best teams for nearly a century, this was the seventh consecutive year that teams with non-winning seasons participated in bowl games.  To fill the 70 available team-competitive bowl slots, a total of 13 teams (19% of all participants) with non-winning seasons participated in bowl games—12 had a .500 (6-6) season and, for the second consecutive year, a team with a sub-.500 (6-7) season was invited to a bowl game.

Selection of the teams

Bowl-eligibility contingency plan
As per 2010 and 2011, initial bowl eligibility would go to teams with no lower than a non-losing record (6-6) for the season.  On August 2, 2012, the NCAA Division I Board of Directors approved a significant change to the process to determine bowl eligible teams, going so far as to potentially allow 5-7 teams to go to a bowl, in case there were not enough regular bowl-eligible teams to fill every game.
If a bowl has one or more conferences/teams unable to meet their contractual commitments and there are no available bowl-eligible teams, the open spots can be filled – by the particular bowl's sponsoring agencies – as follows:

 Teams finishing 6–6 with one win against a team from the lower Football Championship Subdivision  (FCS), regardless of whether that FCS school meets NCAA scholarship requirements. Until now, an FCS win counted only if that opponent met the scholarship requirements—specifically, that school had to award at least 90% of the FCS maximum of 63 scholarship equivalents over a two-year period. In the 2012 season, programs in four FCS conferences cannot meet the 90% requirement (56.7 equivalents)—the Ivy League, which prohibits all athletic scholarships; the Patriot League and Pioneer Football League, which do not currently award football scholarships; and the Northeast Conference, which limits football scholarships to 38 equivalents.
 6-6 teams with two wins over FCS schools.
 Teams that finish 6–7 with loss number seven in their conference championship game.
 6-7 teams that normally play a 13-team schedule, such as Hawaii's home opponents. Although Hawaii normally plays a 13-game schedule, it only played 12 games this season.
 FCS teams who are in the final year of the two-year FBS transition process, if they have at least a 6–6 record.
 Finally, 5-7 teams that have a top-5 Academic Progress Rate (APR) score. This was later adjusted to allow other 5-7 teams to be selected thereafter—in order of their APR.

This process was created as a number of schools were banned, self-banned or potentially banned from the 2012 bowls, risking unfilled bowl games under the previous process: Ohio State, Penn State, North Carolina and UCF received bowl bans for this season (UCF's appeal hearing has been delayed until 2013, keeping them eligible this season), while there were unresolved NCAA cases examining Oregon and Miami (Miami has self-imposed a bowl ban for both 2011 and 2012).

Note: Georgia Tech lost in the ACC Championship Game to go 6–7 on the season.  Georgia Tech applied for a waiver, distinct from the bowl-eligibility contingency plan, stating that they were forced to play the ACC Championship Game because higher finishing Miami self-imposed a postseason ban in a bid to lessen possible NCAA sanctions resulting from their school's 2011 athletics scandal.  (North Carolina, which also finished ahead of Georgia Tech, was ineligible to participate due to NCAA sanctions.)  The NCAA granted Georgia Tech the waiver and direct, non-contingent, eligibility for bowl play.

Bowl Championship Series
Ten teams were selected for the Bowl Championship Series:

Conference Champions
Alabama qualified directly for the 2013 BCS National Championship Game as BCS #2. Alabama also won the SEC Championship Game.
Stanford qualified by winning the Pac-12 Championship Game and  played in the 2013 Rose Bowl, which agreed to host the Pac-12 champion.
Florida State qualified by winning the ACC Championship Game and played in the 2013 Orange Bowl, which agreed to host the ACC champion.
Wisconsin qualified by winning the Big Ten Championship Game and played in the 2013 Rose Bowl, which agreed to host the Big Ten champion.
Kansas State qualified by winning Big 12's spot in a tie-breaker over Oklahoma, having defeated them in the head-to-head matchup, and played in the 2013 Fiesta Bowl, which hosts the Big 12 champion.
Louisville qualified by winning the Big East Conference.  The Big East champion rotated among bowls; this time it played in the 2013 Sugar Bowl.

At-Large Bids
Notre Dame, an independent, qualified as BCS #1 and played in the 2013 BCS National Championship Game.
Florida, a member of the SEC, qualified as BCS #3 and was selected to play in the 2013 Sugar Bowl.
Oregon, a member of the Pac-12, was eligible for an at-large selection as BCS #4 and was selected to play in the 2013 Fiesta Bowl.
Northern Illinois, the winner of the MAC championship game, qualified by being the highest-ranked (BCS #15) member of a non-AQ conference to finish in the Top 16 of the BCS and higher ranked than at least one AQ-conference champion (in this case, both Louisville and Wisconsin).  NIU was selected to play in the 2013 Orange Bowl.

Bowl eligibility

Eligible
 ACC (6) : Clemson (ACC Atlantic Division Co-Champions), Florida State (ACC Atlantic Division Champions, ACC Champions), Duke, NC State, Virginia Tech, Georgia Tech (ACC Coastal Division Co-Champions)
 Big East (5) : Louisville (Big East Co-Champions), Rutgers (Big East Co-Champions), Cincinnati (Big East Co-Champions), Syracuse (Big East Co-Champions), Pittsburgh
 Big Ten (7) : Northwestern, Wisconsin (Big Ten Champions), Nebraska (Big Ten Legends Division Champions), Michigan, Minnesota, Purdue, Michigan State
 Big 12 (9) : Kansas State (Big 12 Co-Champions), Texas Tech, Texas, Oklahoma (Big 12 Co-Champions), TCU, Oklahoma State, Iowa State, West Virginia, Baylor
 Conference USA (5) : Tulsa (Conference USA Champions), UCF (C-USA East Division Champions), East Carolina, SMU, Rice 
 Independents (3) : BYU, Notre Dame, Navy
 MAC (7) : NIU (MAC Champions), Ohio, Toledo, Kent State (MAC East Champions), Ball State, Bowling Green, Central Michigan
 Mountain West (5) :  Nevada, Boise State (Mountain West Conference (Co-Champions)), Fresno State (Mountain West Conference (Co-Champions)), San Diego State (Mountain West Conference (Co-Champions)), Air Force
 Pac-12 (8) :  Stanford (Pac-12 Champion),  Oregon (Pac-12 North Division Co-Champions), USC, Oregon State, UCLA (Pac-12 South Division Champions), Arizona, Washington, Arizona State
 SEC (9) : South Carolina, Alabama (SEC Champions), Florida (SEC East Division Co-Champions), LSU, Mississippi State, Georgia (SEC East Division Co-Champions, East Division representative in SEC Championship Game), Texas A&M, Vanderbilt, Ole Miss
 Sun Belt (5) : Western Kentucky, Louisiana–Monroe,  Arkansas State (Sun Belt Conference Champions), Louisiana–Lafayette, Middle Tennessee
 WAC (3) : Utah State (WAC Champions),  San Jose State, Louisiana Tech
Number of bowl berths available: 70
Number of teams assured of bowl eligibility: 72 (71 plus 6–7 Georgia Tech, per NCAA waiver)

Bowl eligible teams that did not receive a bid:  2
 WAC: Louisiana Tech (9-3)
 Sun Belt: Middle Tennessee (8-4)

Note: On Friday, November 30, Louisiana Tech was invited to play in the Independence Bowl but asked for more time as they were in negotiations with the Liberty Bowl and Heart of Dallas Bowl. Louisiana Tech athletic director Bruce Van De Velde and WAC commissioner Jeff Hurd both claimed that on Saturday, December 1, the Liberty Bowl executive director Steve Ehrhart guaranteed the Bulldogs a bowl invite. After the Independence Bowl's deadline for Louisiana Tech to accept their invitation passed, the Independence Bowl selected the MAC's Ohio (8-4) instead. On Sunday, December 2, the Liberty Bowl extended their remaining bid to Iowa State (6-6) instead of Louisiana Tech (9-3). The Bulldogs did not end up playing in any bowl game despite boasting the nation's top scoring offense. Other media reports indicated that the Liberty Bowl and Sun Belt were discussing placing the winner of Arkansas State and Middle Tennessee State in the Memphis-based Liberty bowl.

Teams unable to become bowl-eligible
 ACC (6): North Carolina (via NCAA sanctions), Miami (FL) (via self-imposed bowl ban), Boston College, Virginia, Maryland, Wake Forest 
 Big East (3): Temple, South Florida, Connecticut   
 Big Ten (5): Ohio State (via NCAA sanctions), Penn State (via NCAA sanctions), Illinois, Iowa, Indiana
 Big 12 (1): Kansas
 C-USA: (7): Southern Miss, Marshall, Memphis, UAB, UTEP, Tulane, Houston
 Independents (1): Army
 MAC (6): Akron, UMass, Eastern Michigan, Buffalo, Western Michigan, Miami-Ohio
 Mountain West (5): UNLV, Wyoming,  Colorado State, Hawaii, New Mexico
 Pac-12 (4): Colorado, California, Washington State, Utah
 SEC (5): Kentucky, Auburn, Arkansas, Tennessee, Missouri
 Sun Belt (5): FIU, Florida Atlantic, South Alabama, North Texas, Troy
 WAC (4): Idaho, New Mexico State, Texas State, UTSA (ineligible as first-year transitional FBS school) 
Number of teams assured of bowl ineligibility: 52 (since the above noted bowl-eligibility contingency plan was not required)

New bowl sponsors
The Champs Sports Bowl, in Orlando, is now the Russell Athletic Bowl. The Insight Bowl, held in Tempe, Arizona, is now the Buffalo Wild Wings Bowl.  The TicketCity Bowl has been renamed the Heart of Dallas Bowl; its new sponsor is Plains Capital Bank.

Moratorium on new bowl games
The NCAA has placed a three-year moratorium, starting with the 2011-12 bowl season, on any new bowl games.  This follows the addition of two new games (Pinstripe Bowl, TicketCity Bowl) for the 2010-11 bowl season, bringing the total number of bowl games to 35.  The expansion to 70 teams required to fill these 35 bowl games has challenged the ability to actually find enough teams with winning (7-5 or better) records to fill bowl slots.  Teams with non-winning (6-6) and losing (6-7) records have participated in bowl games since the expansion to 35 games.  As discussed above (Bowl-eligibility contingency plan), the NCAA was forced to anticipate a need to allow teams with even worse (5-7) losing records to fill bowl selection slots in 2012-13.

Schedule
The bowl game schedule was released July 10, 2012. On December 2, 2012, the final BCS standings were announced and teams were officially selected for the various bowl games.

NOTES:  *All times are EST (UTC −5).  *Rankings are from final BCS Poll.

Non-BCS games

2013 Bowl Championship Series schedule

Post-BCS all-star games

References

Further reading